Snipatuit Pond is a shallow  warm water pond in Rochester, Massachusetts. The average depth is five feet and the maximum depth is six feet, except for one very small nine foot hole near the pump station on the west shore. The pond is the headwaters of the Mattapoisett River. The inflow comes from two sources: Cedar Swamp, which is located to the northeast, and Great Quittacas Pond, which is connected to Snipatuit Pond and located to the northwest. The water quality is impaired due to wetlands vegetation. The boat access to the pond is a dirt ramp with limited parking located off Neck Road. Shoreline access is limited to the area east of the pond bordering Neck Road.

References

External links
MassWildlife - Pond map and information
Environmental Protection Agency

Ponds of Plymouth County, Massachusetts
Rochester, Massachusetts
Ponds of Massachusetts